Notocorrhenes is a genus of beetle in the family Cerambycidae. Its only species is Notocorrhenes dispersa. It was described by Pascoe in 1859.

References

Pteropliini
Beetles described in 1859